Abla Ki Shakti is a 1940 Bollywood film directed by Munshi Dil Lucknowi. It stars Jehanara Kajjan, Phool Kumari, and Premlata

References

External links
 

1940 films
1940s Hindi-language films
Indian black-and-white films